Gamvas is a 2D HTML5 game engine for the canvas element. Gamvas tries to reduce low level tasks for the developer by providing a general game programming framework with game states, actors, actor states, cameras and Box2D physics integration. It is developed by the author of the MIT licensed C/C++ game engine Sge2d and shares many ideas with it.

Licensing 

As of June 7, 2012 Gamvas is available under open source MIT license without feature limitation. Before this it was available in a lite version free for non commercial use and a pro version with enhanced features and the right to use it in commercial projects.

Example 

The following example is a very basic hello world running with a constant frame rate:

myState = gamvas.State.extend({
    draw: function(t) {
        this.c.fillStyle = "#fff";
        this.c.fillText("Hello World!", 0, 0);
    }
});
gamvas.event.addOnLoad(function() {
    gamvas.state.addState(new myState('hello'));
    gamvas.start('canvasid');
});

See also
 List of game engines
 Canvas element

External links 
 Dashplay, a visual game development tool using Gamvas 

Video game engines
Free game engines